Worldwide Jam (WWJ) is an Internet based magazine for parkour. The magazine itself features a multitude of articles including the appearance of parkour in the media.

Planet Parkour 

Planet Parkour is a program on the Worldwide Jam website that was developed by Chris Phillips and is an adaptation of the Hotspot Map found on the South Coast Parkour community website. The program itself is based on a Google Maps API and displays on the map a parkour "hotspot" location, also it is possible for any traceur using the service to set their own personal location showing where they themselves are.

Global Connect 
Global Connect or the International Crew Directory is another service offered by the magazine that enables internet communities or groups of traceurs "teams" to have a link to their own websites.

References

External links
 

Online magazines published in the United Kingdom
Parkour
Magazines established in 2005